Protostropharia, is a coprophilous agaric fungal genus that produces glutinous, mostly yellowish to yellow brown fruit bodies. Characteristically most form chrysocystidia and rather large, smooth, violaceous basidiospores each with a prominent germ pore (as Stropharia subg. Stercophila).  It is differentiated from Stropharia by production of astrocystidia on its mycelium rather than by acanthocytes that Stropharia produces. Phylogenetically, Protostropharia is distinct from Stropharia, Pholiota, and Leratiomyces. Two species, P. luteonitens and P. tuberosa, form pseudosclerotia in the dung substrates.

Etymology
The name Protostropharia refers to the less anatomically complex astrocystidia (Greek ) as compared to the acanthocytes in Stropharia.

References

Agaricales genera
Strophariaceae